The Roanoke Wrath were an American soccer team that played in Roanoke, Virginia. Established as a replacement for the Roanoke RiverDawgs, the Wrath were under the local ownership group Roanoke Pro Soccer, Inc. and played the majority of their home games at the former Victory Stadium.

Year-by-year

References

Defunct soccer clubs in Virginia
Sports in Roanoke, Virginia
USL Second Division teams
1998 establishments in Virginia
Soccer clubs in Virginia
Association football clubs established in 1998
Association football clubs disestablished in 2000
2000 disestablishments in Virginia